Lariano is a comune (municipality) in the Metropolitan City of Rome in the Italian region Lazio, located about  southeast of Rome on the Alban Hills.

Twin towns
 Victoria, since April 2007
 Sausset-les-Pins, France
 Crecchio, Italy
 San Ferdinando di Puglia, Italy

References

External links
Official website 

Cities and towns in Lazio
Castelli Romani